Skipworth & Turner are a male duo, consisting of Rodney Skipworth (from Syracuse, New York) and Phil Turner (from Memphis, Tennessee). Their biggest hit came in 1985, when they went to No. 1 on the US Billboard Hot Dance Club Play chart with "Thinking About Your Love". The track reached No. 24 in the UK Singles Chart, and a further release, "Make It Last" peaked at No. 60 in the same chart in January 1989.

The duo disbanded in 1991. A greatest hits compilation was issued the following year by Unidisc Music.

Discography

Studio albums
 Skipworth & Turner (1985) (4th & Broadway)
 Harlem Nights  (1989) (4th & Broadway)

Compilation albums
 The Greatest Hits (1992)

Singles

See also
List of Billboard number-one dance club songs
List of artists who reached number one on the U.S. Dance Club Songs chart

References

External links
 Discogs

American dance music groups
American soul musical groups
American boogie musicians
American musical duos
Musical groups established in 1985